Rose Hill Drive is the debut album from American power trio Rose Hill Drive. The album was released on August 22, 2006. The release of the album meant the Rose Hill Drive EP was put out of print as 3 of the 4 songs included on it feature on the album.

Track listing
"Showdown" – 4:04
"Cold Enough" – 4:07
"Cool Cody" – 5:23
"The Guru" – 5:19
"In the Beginning..." – 1:36
"Brain Novocaine..." – 2:49
"Declaration of Independence..." – 2:23
"It's Simple" – 2:21
"Raise Your Hands" – 4:59
"Man on Fire" – 2:56
"Reptilian Blues" – 7:31
"Cross the Line" – 4:20

All songs by Rose Hill Drive.
Tracks 5–8 form a connected acoustic suite, that flows continuously.

Credits

Jacob Sproul, bass guitar and lead vocals
Daniel Sproul, guitars and backing vocals
Nathan Barnes, drums

Rose Hill Drive albums
2006 albums